The year 1780 in science and technology involved some significant events.

Biology
 Clément Joseph Tissot publishes Gymnastique médicinale et chirurgicale, ou, essai sur l'utilité du mouvement, ou des différens exercices du corps, et du repos dans la cure des malades in Paris, the first text on the therapeutic benefits of physical exercise.
 Lazzaro Spallanzani publishes Dissertationi di fisica animale e vegetale, first interpreting the process of animal digestion as a chemical process in the stomach, by action of gastric juice. He also carries out important researches on animal fertilization.

Chemistry
 Lactose is identified as a sugar by Carl Wilhelm Scheele.

Physics
 Jean-Paul Marat publishes Recherches physiques sur le feu (Research into the Physics of Fire) and Découvertes de M. Marat sur la lumière (Mr Marat's Discoveries on Light).

History of science
 Dr John Aikin publishes his Biographical Memoirs of Medicine in Great Britain, the first English language historical dictionary of physicians.

Technology
 Aimé Argand invents the Argand lamp.
 Thomas Earnshaw devises the spring detent escapement for marine chronometers.

Awards
 Copley Medal: Samuel Vince

Births
 January 13 – Pierre Jean Robiquet, French chemist (died 1840).
 March 10 – William Charles Ellis, English psychiatric physician (died 1839).
 April 13 – Alexander Mitchell, Irish engineer and inventor of the screw-pile lighthouse (died 1868).
 September 5 - Clarke Abel (died 1826), British surgeon and naturalist.
 December 26 – Mary Somerville, British scientific writer (died 1872).
 Elizabeth Philpot, English paleontologist (died 1857).

Deaths
 January 22 – André Levret, French obstetrician (born 1703)
 October 17 – William Cookworthy, English chemist (born 1705)
 undated – John Kay, English inventor (born 1704)

References

 
18th century in science
1780s in science